Myong Song-chol (born 3 November 1982) is a North Korean former footballer. He represented North Korea on at least fourteen occasions between 2001 and 2003, scoring once.

Career statistics

International

International goals
Scores and results list North Korea's goal tally first, score column indicates score after each North Korea goal.

References

1982 births
Living people
North Korean footballers
North Korea international footballers
Association football defenders
2004 AFC Asian Cup players